Qanbarabad (also Romanized as Qanbarābād; also known as Qanbar Shāh) is a village in Ramand-e Shomali Rural District, Khorramdasht District, Takestan County, Qazvin Province, Iran. At the 2006 census, its population was 224, in 50 families.

References 

Populated places in Takestan County